Mo'Roots is an album by the American saxophonist Maceo Parker, released in 1991. It peaked at No. 4 on Billboard'''s Traditional Jazz Albums chart.

ProductionMo' Roots was produced by Stephan Meyner and Parker. Fred Wesley and Pee Wee Ellis played on the album. "Sister Sadie" is a cover of the Horace Silver song.

Critical reception

The Chicago Tribune determined that "there's enough variety to keep things interesting, but enough clarity of musical direction to make it all hang together and, more important, make Parker feel at home with the material." The Washington Post'' wrote: "From Dixieland to hard bop to R&B, from Lionel Hampton to Ray Charles to Marvin Gaye to Otis Redding to Maceo himself, it's all here, underscored by an unfussy and decidedly funky rhythm section and enlivened by a now legendary horn triumvirate."

Track listing

Personnel

Maceo Parker - alto saxophone
Bill Stewart - drums
Rodney Jones - guitar
Larry Goldings - Hammond organ
Pee Wee Ellis - tenor saxophone
Fred Wesley - trombone
Jimmy Madison - drums on "Fa Fa Fa (The Sad Song)"
Kym Mazelle, Maceo Parker - vocals on "Fa Fa Fa (The Sad Song"
Steve Williamson - alto saxophone on "Jack's Back"
Technical
Achim Kröpsch - cover photography

References

Maceo Parker albums
1991 albums
Verve Records albums